Karol Mikrut (born 26 February 1992) is a Polish luger. He competed at the FIL World Luge Championships 2013 in Whistler, British Columbia, and at the 2014 Winter Olympics in Sochi, in doubles and team relay.

References

External links

1992 births
Living people
Lugers at the 2014 Winter Olympics
Polish male lugers
Olympic lugers of Poland
Place of birth missing (living people)